Adhemarius dentoni is a species of moth in the family Sphingidae. It was described by Benjamin Preston Clark in 1916.

Distribution 
is found from Peru to Ecuador and has also been recorded from Bolivia.

Description 
The length of the forewings is 55–61 mm.

Biology 
There are at least two generations per year with peak flights from January to February and again from July to August.
The larvae probably feed on Persea species.

References

Adhemarius
Moths described in 1916
Moths of South America